Kelly Chibale PhD, FRSSAf, FRSC (born 1964) is professor of organic chemistry at the University of Cape Town, and the founder and director of H3D research center. In 2018 he was recognized as one of Fortune magazine's top 50 World's Greatest Leaders. He researches target-directed inhibitors.

Early life and education 
Chibale grew up without electricity or running water in Mpika district, Zambia. His parents are Elizabeth Malekano Chanda and Harrison Chibale. He studied chemistry at the University of Zambia, graduating in 1987. Chibale worked at Kafironda Explosives in Mufulira. As there were no opportunities for graduate studies in Zambia, he moved to the University of Cambridge for his PhD, working in Stuart Warren's group on synthetic organic chemistry of optically active molecules. He was funded by a Cambridge Livingstone Trust scholarship.

Research and career 
Following his PhD, Chibale joined the University of Liverpool as a Sir William Ramsay British Research Fellow. He developed optically active alcohols using lanthanides. In 1994 he joined the Scripps Research Institute, creating complicated natural molecules from organic building blocks. He began to explore angiogenesis inhibitors, which can be used to stop cancer cells developing new blood vessels. Inspired by medicinal chemistry, Chibale returned to Africa in 1996, joining the research group of James Bull. In 2002 he joined the University of California, San Francisco as a Sandler Foundation Fellow. He was elected a Professor in 2007 and a Life Fellow of the University of Cape Town in 2009. His group studies treatments for HIV, cancer, malaria and hypertension. He set up collaborations and exchange programs for South African students to learn how to translate basic science into potential products. He was elected a Fellow of the Royal Society of South Africa in 2009.

In 2010 he founded H3D, the first drug discovery centre at the University of Cape Town. The research program received significant media attention and has been supported by Bill Gates. In 2008 he took a sabbatical, working as a Fulbright scholar at the University of Pennsylvania and Pfizer. In 2012 Chibale's group discovered MMV390048, an aminopyridine compound that can be used as a single-dose treatment for malaria. It was the first antimalarial medicine to enter phase 1 human studies in Africa. In 2016 they discovered another antimalarial compound, UCT943. He has written for The Conversation about how Africa's medicinal drug research can paved the landscape for health innovation in the continent.

Today he holds a Chair of Drug Discovery at the University of Cape Town. In 2018 H3D partnered with Merck & Co. to build Africa's capacity for research.

In 2016 the Royal Society of Chemistry recognised him as one of their 175 Faces of chemistry. He was elected a Fellow of the Royal Society of Chemistry in 2014.

References

Living people
Zambian scientists
Academic staff of the University of Cape Town
Alumni of the University of Cambridge
University of Zambia alumni
Fellows of the African Academy of Sciences
Fellows of the Royal Society of South Africa
Members of the Academy of Science of South Africa
Organic chemists
1967 births